The Devil's Eye is a 1960 Swedish fantasy-comedy film written and directed by Ingmar Bergman.

Plot
In accordance with the Irish proverb that "A woman's chastity is a stye in the Devil's eye", Satan believes a pain he feels in his eye is a stye and it is being caused by a virgin on Earth. In particular, the pain is connected to Britt-Marie, the daughter of a vicar. Britt-Marie is still a virgin at 20, and she is engaged to a man named Jonas. Satan fears Britt-Marie may serve as an example to her friends to remain virgin, and opts to send Don Juan to seduce Britt-Marie. Don Juan is enduring what he considers a boring punishment: Repeatedly, a woman comes to him threatening to kill him, and he seduces her and takes her to bed. However, before any sex occurs, a demon emerges to say the "show is over", and the woman disappears. Satan comes to Don Juan, telling him he can go to Earth and if he seduces Britt-Marie, Satan will allow Don Juan to have a dreamless sleep, a relief from his punishment.

Don Juan accepts the challenge, accompanied by his servant Pablo. The demon also follows them, determined Pablo will not enjoy any sex while on Earth. Don Juan and Pablo meet the vicar, a happy and gullible man who invites them to his house. At the house, Pablo becomes enamoured with the vicar's wife, Renata. Don Juan meets Britt-Marie and attempts to seduce her, questioning her relationship with Jonas. She agrees to kiss him. The demon also stokes quarrels between Britt-Marie and Jonas, and Jonas leaves. During the night, Pablo seduces Renata. The demon appears to the vicar to tell him Renata is committing adultery, and gives him the key to Renata's bedroom. Instead of entering the bedroom, the vicar instead uses the key to lock the demon in his cupboard. The next morning, the demon tells the vicar he dreamed that while Renata slept with one of the vicar's guests, his daughter slept with the other.

Concerned, the vicar runs to Britt-Marie's bedroom, but finds her alone there. Don Juan has fallen in love with Britt-Marie and is unable to seduce her in his usual fashion; Satan laments his defeat. After Don Juan returns to hell, Satan learns Britt-Marie has married Jonas, and he takes her virginity on their wedding night. This alone does not cure Satan's eye. However, Britt-Marie lies to Jonas, claiming she had never kissed another man; the lie heals Satan, giving him a minor victory. Satan decides to put Don Juan to sleep, decreeing he will dream of love, a cruel punishment.

Cast
 Jarl Kulle as Don Juan
 Bibi Andersson as Britt-Marie
 Stig Järrel as Satan
 Nils Poppe as The Vicar
 Gertrud Fridh as Renata
 Sture Lagerwall as Pablo
 Georg Funkquist as Count Armand de Rochefoucauld
 Gunnar Sjöberg as Marquis Giuseppe Maria de Macopanza
 Gunnar Björnstrand as The Actor

Production
SF Studios required Bergman to make a comedy before agreeing to produce Bergman's idea for The Virgin Spring. The "Irish proverb" cited in the film is fictional and was invented by Bergman.

Release and reception
In 2018, The Criterion Collection released the film on Blu-ray in Region A, along with 38 other Bergman films, in the set Ingmar Bergman's Cinema. The Devil's Eye has a 67% approval rating on Rotten Tomatoes.

References

External links
 
 

1960 films
1960 comedy films
1960s fantasy comedy films
Swedish black-and-white films
Swedish fantasy comedy films
1960s Swedish-language films
Films based on the Don Juan legend
Films set in hell
Films scored by Erik Nordgren
Films directed by Ingmar Bergman
Films with screenplays by Ingmar Bergman
1960s Swedish films